Nema kajanja (No Regrets) is the eighth studio album by Bosnian folk singer Hanka Paldum featuring the band Južni Vetar. It was released 1 January 1985 through the record label Jugodisk.

Track listing
Nema kajanja
Srce je moje kamen
Kasno je za sve
Hoću da budem samo žena
Pa šta
Lutaj srce
Ne idi
Ne dirajte uspomene
Ne smijemo se rastaviti

References

1985 albums
Hanka Paldum albums
Jugodisk albums